Icaros may refer to:
 Icaros, medicine songs
 Icaros (album), the fifth album from Diablo_(band)
 Icaros (mythology), a character in Greek mythology 
 Icaros Desktop, a distribution of the AROS Research Operating System

See also
 Icarus (disambiguation)
 Icaro (disambiguation)